Don Brennan may refer to:

Don Brennan (cricketer) (1920–1985), English cricketer
Don Brennan (Coronation Street)
Don Brennan (baseball) (1903–1953), pitcher in Major League Baseball